Plagiogeneion is a genus of fish in the family Emmelichthyidae, the rovers. Members of this genus are native to the  southeastern Atlantic, Indian, and Pacific Oceans.

Species
There are currently five recognized species in this genus:
 Plagiogeneion fiolenti Parin, 1991
 Plagiogeneion geminatum Parin, 1991
 Plagiogeneion macrolepis McCulloch, 1914 – bigscale rubyfish
 Plagiogeneion rubiginosum (F. W. Hutton, 1875) – rubyfish
 Plagiogeneion unispina Parin, 1991

References

Emmelichthyidae
Marine fish genera
Taxa named by Henry Ogg Forbes